Naraina railway station is a small railway station in Jaipur district, Rajasthan. Its code is NRI. It serves Naraina village. The station consists of two platforms. The platforms are not well sheltered. It lacks many facilities including water and sanitation.

Major trains

The following trains run from Naraina railway station:

 Ahmedabad–Jaipur Passenger
 Ala Hazrat Express
 Amrapur Aravali Express
 Bhopal–Jaipur Express
 Udaipur City–Haridwar Express
 Indore–Jaipur Express via Ajmer

References

Railway stations in Jaipur district
Jaipur railway division